The Leitha Mountains or, less frequently, Leitha Hills, are a range of hills in Austria lying on the boundary between Lower Austria and Burgenland.

The range is an offshoot of the Alps and forms a connection to the Carpathians to the north.  It is a ridge about 35 km long and 5–7 km wide along the southeastern edge of the Vienna Basin from Brucker Pforte in the northeast to Wiener Neustädter Pforte (Ödenburger Pforte) in the southwest.  The range lies to the southeast of the Leitha River and is considered part of the Randgebirge östlich der Mur division of the Eastern Alps.  Its highest peak, Sonnenberg (Hungarian: Nap-hegy), is 484 m above sea level.

The ridge is heavily forested with deciduous trees such as oak, hornbeam, and beech predominating.

Mountain ranges of Lower Austria
Leitha
Prealps East of the Mur
Mountain ranges of Burgenland